The Cabinet Committee on Security (CCS) of the Government of India discusses, debates and is the final decision-making body on senior appointments in the national security apparatus, defence policy and expenditure, and generally all matters of India's national security.

Members 
The composition of the CCS is:
 Prime Minister of India 
 Minister of Defence
 Minister of Home Affairs
 Minister of Finance 
 Minister of External Affairs 

The National Security Adviser, the Cabinet Secretary and the Defence Secretary have also been attendees of the CCS meetings.

Other Cabinet committees 
Other senior Cabinet Committees (as of 2020) include:

 Appointments Committee of the Cabinet - chaired by the Prime Minister of India
 Cabinet Committee on Accommodation - chaired by the Home Minister of India
 Cabinet Committee of Economic Affairs - chaired by the Prime Minister of India
 Cabinet Committee of Parliamentary Affairs - chaired by the Home Minister of India
 Cabinet Committee on Political Affairs - chaired by the Prime Minister of India
 Cabinet Committee on Growth and Investment - chaired by the Prime Minister of India
 Cabinet Committee on Employment and Skill Development- chaired by the Prime Minister of India

See also

Constitution of India
Parliamentary democracy
Union Council of Ministers of India
National Security Council (India)

References

Cabinet Secretariat of India